The Omal (also called Duz Horon or Flat Horon) was one of the first Pontic Greek dances to be developed from the region of Pontos. In the Pontic language,  means "regular" or "smooth." It is a relaxed dance and is danced for long periods of time, usually preluding the tik dance. The step count is step-2-3-4, step-2. It is danced hand by hand.

See also
Greek dances
Music of Greece
Kalamatianos
Syrtos
Tsamiko
Horon

References

External links
https://web.archive.org/web/20060905181302/http://www.karalahana.com/muzik/horon.html
http://www.irsalilar.com/modules.php?name=Downloads&d_op=getit&lid=21
Dam Üstünde Un Eller(Omal Garasaris)(Turkish)
Dam Üstünde Un Eller(Omal Garasaris)
https://www.youtube.com/watch?v=uPirZRST3PQ
Dam Üstünde Un Eller(Omal Garasaris)midi
Syrto(Omal) Bafra

Greek dances
Turkish dances
Pontic Greek dances